The John Sevier State Office Building, also known as the Tennessee State Office Building, is a historic building in Nashville, Tennessee, U.S.. It was designed in the Art Deco architectural style by Emmons H. Woolwine, and completed in 1940. It was named for Governor John Sevier. It has been listed on the National Register of Historic Places since July 13, 2011.

References

Buildings and structures completed in 1940
Buildings and structures in Nashville, Tennessee
Art Deco architecture in Tennessee
Government buildings on the National Register of Historic Places in Tennessee